Virudhunagar Kanthan Ramasamy (1 January 1926 – 24 December 2002) was an Indian actor, comedian and producer who was known for his versatility in various character roles, he played in Tamil films in the years between the 1947 to 2001.

Biography

V. K. Ramasamy was born in Amaravilaa, Madras State, now Tamil Nadu on 1 January 1926. The veteran character actor and comedian, coming on the familiar stage-to-screen in the early 1940s, Ramasamy shot into prominence when, at the age of 21, he donned the role of a 60-year-old father of grown-up sons in Naam Iruvar (1947), first film of the AVM Films. "VKR" as the actor became known, did not look back since then. However, he always got to play only an elderly person throughout his career, which spanned over five decades in which he acted in over 500 films. In the 1960s and 1970s, Ramasamy acted with almost all leading actors including T. R. Mahalingam, M. G. Ramachandran, Sivaji Ganesan, Gemini Ganesan, Jai Shankar, Ravichandran, Muthuraman, Kamal Haasan and Rajinikanth.

Kamal Haasan mentioned veteran V.K.Ramasamy as one of the important persons (/ inspiration) in his life among 60 persons of his
(Kamalhaasan) 60 year cinema career. He showed V.K.Ramasamy's image (along with other 59 important persons of his life who include Sivaji Ganesan, Gemini Ganesan, Rajnikanth, Nagesh and his guru K.Balachander) in  Kamal Haasan's 60th year function ("Ungal Naan" function) at 17 November 2019, Nehru Auditorium, Chennai.

Rajinikanth has shared the profit of Arunachalam with eight producers as Guru Dhatchanai. V.K.Ramasamy is one among the eight producers of Rajinikanth's movie Arunachalam (film) and benefited with the profit share.

Both Kamal Haasan and Rajinikanth showed their respect and love of the most senior actor of the film industry Mr.V.K.Ramasamy. Also Malayalam director Fazil has collaborated with V.K.Ramasamy in his Tamil movies such as  Poove Poochooda Vaa, Arangetra Velai, Varusham Padhinaaru. Comedy actor Dr.Charle mentioned V.K.Ramasamy as his mentor in many interviews and stages, also submitted a chapter in his thesis about the V.K.Ramasamy's contribution of humor in Tamil cinema.

He was known for his dialogue delivery, especially as a villain or comedian. He was at ease playing any role and paired with the veteran comedienne, Manorama, to play some memorable roles in Tamil films. Peers always respected his old world values of discipline on the sets. In the later part of his career, Ramasamy produced over 15 films. Among his last films was Dum Dum Dum, that represents the fourth generation of Tamil cinema. He died on 24 December 2002, after a brief illness. He was 76. The end came in the morning a day after VKR was discharged from the Government General hospital, where he had been admitted for a variety of complaints including hypertension, diabetes and cardiac problems.

Partial filmography
He acted in many number of films with Tamil film heroes playing the roles of comedian and supporting characters.

References

Tamil film producers
Male actors in Tamil cinema
20th-century Indian male actors
Male actors from Tamil Nadu
1926 births
2002 deaths
Male actors in Malayalam cinema
Indian male film actors
People from Virudhunagar district
21st-century Indian male actors